Buriadia is a genus that existed from the Carboniferous to the Permian. Vascular plants that are reproduced by seed and the type species had only Buriadia heterophylla. Put the name of Buriadiaceae family.

Location

In Paleorrota geopark, located in Brazil, were found rare branches of the genus Buriadia, are in the Rio Bonito Formation and date from Sakmarian in the Permian.

References

Prehistoric gymnosperm genera
Voltziales